Yek Langi (also Romanized as Yek Langī, Yak Lengī, and Yek Lengī; also known as Ek Langi) is a village in Sistan Rural District, Kuhpayeh District, Isfahan County, Isfahan Province, Iran. At the 2006 census, its population was 212, in 56 families.

References 

Populated places in Isfahan County